Henry Clay Nelson (July 29, 1836 - April 17, 1909) was an American lawyer and politician from New York.

Life
Henry Clay Nelson was born on July 29, 1836 in Bedford, Westchester County, New York.

He was a member of the New York State Assembly (Westchester Co., 3rd D.) in 1868. He was Warden of Sing Sing State Prison from 1869 to 1870, and from 1872 to 1873.

He was a member of the New York State Senate (12th D.) from 1882 to 1887, sitting in the 105th, 106th, 107th, 108th, 109th and 110th New York State Legislatures.

Sources
 Civil List and Constitutional History of the Colony and State of New York compiled by Edgar Albert Werner (1884; pg. 291 and 370)
 Manual of Westchester County, Past and Present  by Henry Townsend Smith (1912; pg. 256)

1836 births
1909 deaths
Democratic Party New York (state) state senators
People from Bedford, New York
Democratic Party members of the New York State Assembly
Wardens of Sing Sing
19th-century American politicians